Zedmore and The Band of Blues is a Swedish blues band, led by singer, songwriter, and multi-instrumentalist Zedmore. His full name is Zedmore Per Emil Lindroth, born 1979 in Stockholm, Sweden. During the 1990s he starred in the Swedish soap opera "Three Crowns" but gave up his acting career for a career as a musician. Zedmore has worked as a producer, studio musician and songwriter for Blind Dog Records, Stockholm Records among others and later created his own label "L" to distribute his music. All material recorded in the studio is made entirely by Zedmore. The Band of Blues was what he called the music he made himself to back his singing in the studio.

The Band of Blues
At first "The Band of Blues" was the combined tracks of Zedmore made in the studio to accompany his vocals. But as the requests grew for live appearances, Zedmore put together an actual band.
Band members have varied over the years, sometimes even from gig to gig. But when Zedmore´s father´s old blues band dissolved, Zedmore included his father to play lead electric guitar. The bass-guitar player and drummer from his father´s old band was also included in "The Band of Blues" permanently (the current group also includes an additional guitarist).

Blues musical groups
Musical groups from Stockholm